The 2022 San Marcos Open Aguascalientes was a professional tennis tournament played on clay courts. It was the 1st edition of the tournament which was part of the 2022 ATP Challenger Tour. It took place in Aguascalientes, Mexico between 18 and 24 April 2022.

Singles main-draw entrants

Seeds

 1 Rankings as of April 11, 2022.

Other entrants
The following players received wildcards into the singles main draw:
  Diego Balderas
  Rodrigo Pacheco Méndez
  Shang Juncheng

The following player received entry into the singles main draw as a special exempt:
  Antoine Bellier

The following players received entry into the singles main draw as alternates:
  Viktor Durasovic
  Bernard Tomic

The following players received entry from the qualifying draw:
  Nicolás Barrientos
  Elmar Ejupovic
  Adrián Menéndez Maceiras
  Shintaro Mochizuki
  Akira Santillan
  Matías Zukas

The following player received entry as a lucky loser:
  Malek Jaziri

Champions

Singles

 Marc-Andrea Hüsler def.  Juan Pablo Ficovich 6–4, 4–6, 6–3.

Doubles

  Nicolás Barrientos /  Miguel Ángel Reyes-Varela def.  Gonçalo Oliveira /  Divij Sharan 7–5, 6–3.

References

2022 ATP Challenger Tour
2022 in Mexican tennis
April 2022 sports events in Mexico